The old woman and her pig is a cumulative English nursery rhyme which originally developed in oral lore form until it was collected and first appeared as an illustrated print on 27 May 1906 as the true history of a little old woman who found a silver penny published by Tabart & Co.for their Juvenile Library at No. 157 New Bond Street, London.  Since this time it has been re-published and re-told in print form many times.

Etymology 
As the nursery rhyme has been retold and republished many times, subtle variations in the name have appeared but all variations have been under two broad categories: -

Category (1) -  Name refers to the Pig, examples: -

 The Old Woman and Her Pig
 The Old Woman and Her Pig: An Old English Tale
 The Remarkable Adventures of an Old Woman and Her Pig. An Ancient Tale in a Modern Dress

Category (2) - Name refers to the Coin, examples: - 
 The Old Woman and the Crooked Sixpence
 The True History of a Little Old Woman who Found a Silver Penny
 The tale of Old Mother Muggins who finds ‘a new sixpence’
There is one publication which transcends both categories and does not mention the old woman: -

 The Pig bought with a Silver Penny

Classification 
Under the Aarne-Thompson-Uther Index (ATU) of different types of folktales, this nursery rhyme is classified as follows: -

 > ATU
 > 2000-2399: Formula Tales 
 > 2000-2100: Cumulative Tales 
 > 2030: The old woman and her pig

Under Stith Thompson's Motif-Index of Folk-Literature, this nursery rhyme is classified as follows: -

 > Z. Miscellaneous Groups of Motifs
 > Z0—Z99. Formulas
 > Z40. Chains with interdependent members
 > Z41. The old woman and her pig

Under the Roud Folk Song Index, this nursery rhyme is classified as follows: -

 > 746. "The Old Woman and her Pig", "Little Betty Pringle"

The plot
An old woman finds a silver penny whilst cleaning her chambers and goes to buy a pig, but can't get home when it refuses to go over a stile, she beseeches:-

 A dog to bite the pig, then on refusal;-
 A stick to beat the dog, then on refusal;- 
 A fire to burn the stick, then on refusal;- 
 Water to quench the fire, then on refusal;- 
 A bull to drink the water; then on refusal;- 
 A butcher to slaughter the bull, then on refusal; -
 A rope to hang the butcher, then on refusal; -
 A rat to gnaw the rope, then on refusal; -
 A cat to eat the rat

The cat accepts her request causing her demands to be met in a cascade until the pig jumps the stile, allowing and old woman to get home that night!

The storyline has varied through adaptations made over the centuries by re-tellers, as listed below.

The rhyme scheme 

The rhyme scheme used for the old woman and her pig is simple couplets interspersed with the odd triplet as exemplified by the verses below: -

Delighted she seized it, and, dancing a jig,

Exclaim’d, “With this money I’ll purchase a pig.”

So saying, away to the market she went,

And the fruits of her fortunate sweeping she spent

Which won't be so civil my Pig just to bite

till he crosses the Stile, though the trouble's so slight,
 
And now I shan't get to my cottage to-night.

Background and adaptations

At the turn of the 19th century, significant improvements in the technology of printing illustrations including wood-cutting and engraving occurred.  Publishers consequently realised there was a market for children's illustrated books with the success of the prototype books such as The Picture Gallery for all Good Boys and Girls. ‘Exhibition the First’, which was published on April 28, 1801. Two of the earliest children's publishers were John Harris and Benjamin Tabart, who both chose to publish the common nursery rhyme;- the old woman and the pig in illustrated form.  After these early forerunners, the nursery rhyme was re-published numerous times, either as part of a compendium or as a stand-alone illustrated book. In the 19th century, the re-tellers were not given credit just the publishers but by the 20th century, the re-tellers were given credit as they varied the rhyme and the story.  A selection of popular single story retellings in the 19th and 20th centuries are listed below: -

19th century retellings 
1806; - The true history of a little old woman who found a silver penny, published by Benjamin Tabart
 1814; - The history of the old woman and her pig, published by John Harris
 1830; - The Old Woman and Her Pig, published by the Williams, Orton & Company
 1835; - Little Old Woman and Her Silver Penny, published by Henry Mozley and Sons
 1838; - The Old Woman and Her Silver Penny, published by James Catnatch
 1847; - The little old woman and her silver penny, published by Thomas Dean & Son
 1847; - The ancient story of The old dame and her pig : a legend of obstinacy : shewing how it cost the old lady a world of trouble, & the pig his tail, published by David Bogue
 1850; - The Old Woman and Her Silver Penny, published by Read & Co.
 1855; - The Old Woman and Her Pig, published by the Sampson Low
 1875; - The Story of the Old Woman and Her Crooked Sixpence,and Some Rhymes Told by Mother Goose, published by S.W. Tilton & Company
 1881; - The Pig bought with a Silver Penny, published by Dean & Son
 1887; - The story of the poor old woman and the obstinate little pig, published by J. Clarke & Company
 1890; - The Old Woman and Her Pig, published by the McLoughlin Brothers

20th century retellings 

 1905; - The Old Woman and Her Silver Sixpence, published by Dean & Son
 1928; - The Old Woman and the Crooked Sixpence, published by Macmillan
 1936; - The Old Woman and Her Pig, retold by M. G. Barnes
 1944; - The Old Woman and Her Pig, retold by Wallace C. Wadsworth
 1960; - Old Woman and Her Pig, retold by Paul Galdone
 1963; - The Old Woman and Her Pig, published by Holt, Rinehart and Winston
 1973; - The Old Woman and Her Pig (Well Lived Tales), retold by Vera Southgate
 1992; - The Old Woman and Her Pig, retold by  Eric A. Kimmel
 1993; - The Old Woman and Her Pig: An Old English Tale, retold by Rosanne Litzinger

References

External links

  The Old Woman and Her Pig (HTML version), Published by Grant and Griffith, successors to J. Harris, in London, 1907, available from Project Gutenberg

English folklore
English nursery rhymes
English folk songs
English children's songs
Traditional children's songs
Year of song unknown
Songwriter unknown